The Singer Scooter is a series of scooters manufactured by the Singer Corporation, made especially for the Bangladeshi market. The scooter is originally made in Chinese factories.  As a product, the scooter embodies Singer Bangladesh's diversification from the sewing machine market into a wide variety of consumer and household goods, and light-industrial manufacturing.

Various models feature four-stroke engines ranging in displacement from 80 to 125 cc, a kick starter, and telescopic shock absorbers.

External links
Singer Bangladesh Company Website

Motorcycle manufacturers of China
Motor scooters
Cycling in Bangladesh